Thelma Cabrera (born September 21,1970) is an indigenous (Maya Mam) human rights defender and politician. Cabrera ran for president of Guatemala in 2019 as part of the political party, Movement for the Liberation of Peoples. She finished fourth in the 2019 election garnering 10.3% of the popular vote.

Upbringing 
Born in a peasant campesino family, Cabrera grew up in El Asintal on the west coast of Guatemala and married at the age of 15. In her early years, Cabrera worked alongside her parents and siblings harvesting coffee. When asked about her upbringing, Cabrera told The Guardian “I came from nothing – from under the rubbish. But for many years I’ve worked with communities suffering lack of opportunities, undignified wages, migration and violence as a result of structural problems and corruption". Growing up, Cabrera did not have access to further education (University, Primary School) like many other indigenous women in Guatemala. As a result, her political opponents used her lack of schooling to portray her as uneducated and uncouth throughout her campaign trail. Despite her credibility being questioned, Cabrera has continued to emphasize to her supporters that she has "much knowledge in the university of life" and her lack of schooling will not prevent her from enacting change. Inspired by her rough upbringing, Cabrera has pledged to tackle malnutrition, illiteracy, landlessness, social exclusion and poverty – all of which she encountered as a child. Given that one in three indigenous women has no access to healthcare and family services in Guatemala, Cabrera has made it a focus of her politics and policies to provide high-quality education and an efficient healthcare systems to underprivileged women in Guatemala .

Politics and Presidential Campaign (2019) 
Cabrera has been an active member of Peasant Development Committee (CODECA), a grassroots human rights organization working to improve the situation of the rural poor of Guatemala. Cabrera was selected to represent CODECA's newly formed political party, Movement for the Liberation of Peoples (MLP), to run in the 2019 Guatemalan general election on June 16, 2019. Both the MLP and CODECA have dealt with severe backlash regarding their mission to empower and represent indigenous communities. Activists and politicians like Cabrera have received countless death threats throughout their respective campaigns. In 2018, following the formation of the MLP, a member of CODECA's national leadership, Luis Arturo Marroquín was murdered. Seven other members of CODECA and Campesino organizations were murdered between May and June of 2018 leading up to the election.

The only candidate of indigenous origin, she has no university degree or political experience, unlike her opponents. She was criticised during the campaign by the mainstream media for her lack of academic education, her sometimes awkward Castilian and her dress.

On June 15, 2019, Cabrera was polling fifth in a race with 20 candidates. With half of the ballots counted, Cabrera was coming in as fourth with 10.3% of the vote. By the time the majority of the ballots were counted, only the top two candidates, Sandra Torres with 26% of the votes and Alejandro Giammattei with 15% of the votes, are left to compete in a runoff election in August 2019, leaving Cabrera out of the race. The MLP reported several irregularities regarding ballots during the race, however, their accusations were rejected and a ballot recount was conducted with no avail.

Cabrera’s fourth-place finish among the nineteen candidates was the highest finish of any indigenous presidential candidate in Guatemalan history. Her party, the MLP, also elected one representative to congress while seven other representatives were elected from majority indigenous parties. Despite the population being 60% indigenous, Cabrera was only the second indigenous woman to run for president since Rigoberta Menchu and if elected, she would’ve been the first ever president that was not a man of Spanish descent. Her campaign slogan “Yo Elijo Dignidad” or “I Choose Dignity” targeted Guatemala’s long history of corrupt elections and mistreatment of indigenous peoples. All three of the candidates who finished above Cabrera were involved in their own sets of controversies and allegations. Sandra Torres (finished 2nd) was accused of money laundering and illicit campaign funding, while Alejandro Giammattei faced backlash for his role in the extra judicial executions of 7 prisoners in 2006. Roberto Arzú who finished third amongst the candidates, also faced sanctions to pay off multimillion dollar debts owed to his political strategist. Cabrera planned to address these issues by lowering pay for government officials to prevent candidates from participating in politics for the purpose of gaining wealth or bolstering their business connections.

Presidential election 2023 
The MLP re-nominated her to represent it in the 2023 presidential election along with Jordán Rodas, former human rights ombudsman, as its vice-presidential candidate. Jordán Rodas has gained international recognition for his fight against impunity during the government of former president Jimmy Morales and the current administration of Alejandro Giammattei. Their candidacy was rejected by the Guatemalan electoral court.

Human rights organisations and international observers criticised the Electoral Tribunal's decision as a political vendetta by President Giammattei. Political scientist and Latin American election expert Daniel Zovatto criticised it as an 'electoral coup'.

Goals and Views 
During her presidential bid, Cabrera aimed to defend the individual and collective rights of indigenous and marginalized groups in Guatemala by enacting constitutional reform. Through her platform, Cabrera has promised to give a voice to the silent majority of Guatemala (indigenous population) and proposed reforms to reflect the heart of Guatemalan society. Some of her priorities include fair representation for indigenous and Afro-Guatemalan peoples, an efficient healthcare system and respect for labor rights. Referring to herself as a "protector of Mother Earth", Cabrera also wants to ensure Guatemala fosters a healthy and thriving environment with a coexisting economy that does not interfere with nature and Guatemalan ecosystems. This concept is consistent with the beliefs of many indigenous Mayans and other groups in Guatemala. Her social and economic goals for Guatemala follow the “Buen Vivir” or “Good Life” model adopted by countries like Ecuador and Bolivia. Under this model, political procedures and systems are changed to eliminate classism, favor education, respect labor rights and to ensure basic needs like access to water and electricity, are fulfilled. Cabrera believes that under this model, the customs and values that her ancestors displayed will be recovered.

References 

1970 births
Living people
21st-century Guatemalan women politicians
21st-century Guatemalan politicians
Guatemalan women activists
Guatemalan Maya people
Guatemalan indigenous rights activists
Women human rights activists
People from Retalhuleu Department
Movement for the Liberation of Peoples politicians